Appelman is a Dutch surname. As appelman was a name for a fruit dealer, the surname could have an occupational origin. People with this name include:

 Bartholomeus Appelman (1628–1686), Dutch painter
 Barry Appelman, American computer programmer
 Ted Appelman (born 1980), Canadian curler
 Zach Appelman (born 1985), American actor

See also 
 Appelmans

References 

Dutch-language surnames
Occupational surnames